Folketing elections were held in Denmark on 21 September 1920, except in the Faroe Islands, where they were held on 30 October. They were the first in which South Jutland County participated since the Schleswig Plebiscites and the return to Danish rule, and the total number of seats in the Folketing was increased from 140 to 149. The result was a victory for Venstre, which won 51 of the 149 seats. Voter turnout was 77.0% in Denmark proper and 56.2% in the Faroe Islands.

Results

References

1920 09
Denmark
Folketing 3
Denmark